Wilfred Melville Bennetto (1902–1994) was a Cornish poet and novelist.

He was elected a member of Gorseth Kernow under the Bardic name of Abransek ('Bushy-browed One') in 1968.

His poetry celebrated popular contemporary figures in Cornish life as well as the historical and mythological characters favoured in Cornish poetry at the time. He wrote An Gurun Wosek a Geltya ('The Bloody Crown of Celtia'), the first full-length novel in Cornish. It is written from a monarchist perspective, it is a romantic thriller set against the background of contemporary subversion and conflict in the Celtic countries.

Publications as Melville Bennetto
An Lef Kernewek (1969)
Kernow (1974).
Whethlow Pymp Mynysen Penzance :Printed by Headland Printing (1974)
Whethlow Kernewek (Cornish Stories). (1978)
And Shall Tregeale Die?, Headland Pubns, Penzance (1979) 
An Gurun Wosek a Geltya, Dyllansow Truran (1984) 
The Saints of Cornwall: and Other Poems Dyllansow Truran (1986)

References

1902 births
1994 deaths
Bards of Gorsedh Kernow
Cornish-language writers
Novelists from Cornwall
Poets from Cornwall
20th-century British novelists
20th-century British poets